The Honda Motra is a minibike produced in 1982–3 for the Japanese domestic market.

Honda marketed the vehicle as a heavy-duty recreation bike with a large load capacity.

The Motra has a distinctively rugged appearance, with angular steel tube and panel framework supporting large racks fore and aft. The utility/military style is emphasized by a lack of decorative chrome, and a solid yellow or green paint scheme for all bodywork and wheels.

The Motra's 3-speed gearbox is coupled with a second stage to provide the same 3-speeds with a lower final ratio for low-speed off-road travel in steep terrain.

The Motra's CT50 designation is a slight exception in Honda nomenclature in that 'CT' does not indicate a mechanical family of bikes. It is distinct from the CT70, which is an ST-series bike for the US and Canadian market, and from the CT50/CT90/CT110 Trail Cubs, which are an offshoot of the Super Cub bikes. The Motra's CT50 designation is a re-use of the Trail Cub CT50 designation from 1968.

In 2004 Honda resurrected the Motra's style, but not off-road utility, with the PS250 Big Ruckus scooter.

See also
Honda CT series bikes

References

 Infobox specifications from these honda.co.jp pages on 2008-02-27: 
http://www.honda.co.jp/news/1982/2820609m.html
http://www.honda.co.jp/pressroom/library/motor/sports/reisure/t_index2.html

CT50 Motra
Motorcycles introduced in 1982
Minibikes